Malwina Garfeinowa-Garska (15 October 1870 in Warsaw – 19 September 1932 in Kraków), pseudonym Maria Zabojecka, was a Polish literary critic, translator from Scandinavian literature, prosaist, writer. She was the sister of Stanisław Posner.

Garfeinowa-Garska was an activist in independent, socialist and emancipative movements. Member of Związek Zagraniczny Socjalistów Polskich (since 1896). She was an editor of Krytyka (1899). Since 1921 she used her pseudonym Maria Zabojecka. In her critical works Garfeinowa-Garska supported art related with social and political life.

Notable works
 Gromnice (1907), a sociopsychological novel
 Powieść o duszy polskiej (1912), an essay

References
 
 

1870 births
1932 deaths
Polish essayists
Polish women essayists
Polish literary critics
Polish women literary critics
Polish translators
Polish women writers
Polish activists
Polish women activists